Loud Connection is a 2019 Russian comedy film directed by Aleksey Nuzhnyy. It is a remake of the 2016 Italian film
Perfect Strangers (2016).

Plot 
Seven friends, gathered in a country house, jokingly begin the game-the participants must read aloud all the messages coming to them, and answer calls only on the speakerphone. They can not imagine what amazing revelations they have to make about each other.

Cast
 Kamil Larin as Lev
 Maria Mironova as Eva, Lev's wife
 Rostislav Khait as Boris
 Irina Gorbacheva as Alina, Boris's wife
 Leonid Barats	as Vadim	
 Anastasia Ukolova as  Yekaterina,  Vadim's wife
Aleksandr Demidov	 as Dmitry

See also
 Perfect Strangers
Perfect Strangers (2017), Spanish remake of Perfect Strangers
Nothing to Hide (2018), French remake of Perfect Strangers
Intimate Strangers (2018), цзмSouth Korean remake of Perfect Strangers

References

External links 
 
 Loud Connection on KinoPoisk

2019 films
Russian comedy films
Remakes of Italian films
2019 comedy films
Columbia Pictures films